Koji, Kōji, Kohji or Kouji may refer to:

Kōji (given name), a masculine Japanese given name
Kōji (Heian period) (康治), Japanese era, 1142–1144
Kōji (Muromachi period) (弘治), Japanese era, 1555–1558
Koji orange, a Japanese citrus cultivar
Andrew Koji Shiraki (born 1987), singer/songwriter known as Koji
Koji, the software that builds RPM packages for the Fedora project
Koji, the common name of the fungus Aspergillus oryzae
Koji, an interactive content creation tool from GoMeta

See also
Kojii, music project by Kojii Helnwein
Coji-Coji (コジコジ), an anime series sometimes romanized Koji Koji
Kōji mold Aspergillus oryzae, a fungus used in East Asian fermentation